Littleton High School is a high school located in the town of Littleton, New Hampshire, Grafton County, New Hampshire, United States. During the 2016–2017 year, the school had 224 students.

Notable alumni 

 Michael Cryans, member of the Executive Council of New Hampshire

External links

Littleton High School official website

References

Public high schools in New Hampshire
Schools in Grafton County, New Hampshire
Littleton, New Hampshire